Saayoni Ghosh (born 27 January 1993) is an Indian Bengali film and television actress. She is also a singer and a politician. Her acting debut was with a telefilm Ichhe Dana, and her first appearance on the big screen was with a short role in the film Notobor Notout. She then shared the screen with some veteran actors in Raj Chakraborty's Shotru, and later played a carefree journalist role in Raj Chakraborty's daily serial Proloy Asche. She has played lead roles in the films Kanamachi, Antaraal, Ekla Cholo, Amar sahor, 
Bitnoon, Mayer Biye, Rajkahini. She came into limelight in politics in January 2021 after an irrelevant FIR was lodged against her by Tathagata Roy for hurting Hindu sentiments.
She joined All India Trinamool Congress on 24th February, 2021.

In March 2021, she was announced to be All India Trinamool Congress’s candidate for the Asansol Dakshin constituency in the 2021 West Bengal Legislative Assembly election. But, she was defeated by BJP's candidate Agnimitra Paul.

She was appointed the "president of the youth wing of Trinamool Congress" in June-2021, after Abhishek Banerjee has been relieved of the duty.

Calcutta Football League
Saayoni also co-hosted the Calcutta Football League in 2013 and 2014 for Jalsha Movies during Live telecast.

Filmography

Web series 

 Pocketmaar (Paranoia Series 3rd episode) - 31 December 2017
 Charitraheen - 29 September 2018
 Bou Keno Psycho - 21 February 2019
 Astey Ladies! - 15 March 2019
 Charitraheen 2–29 June 2019
 Rahasya Romancho Series- Season 1
Rahasya Romancho Series- Season 3
 Abar Proloy

Web films 
 Teen Cup Chaa - (2018)

Television

 Ichhe Dana (Guest Appearance) Star Jalsha
 Aparajita Star Jalsha
 Proloy Aschhe Sananda Tv
 Josh Sananda Tv
 Care Kori Na Star Jalsha
 Bhasha Star Jalsha
 Bodhu Kon AAlo Laaglo Chokhe Star Jalsha

Non-fiction

Playback 
 "Kothin Song" with Ash King from Film- Bojhena Shey Bojhena (2012)

Awards

References

External links

 
 
 
 
 Saayoni's film inspires TV series on single mothers
 Saayoni Ghosh's Interview with The Times of India
 Saayoni Ghosh's Interview on Shooting Rajkahini with The Times of India

1993 births
Living people
Actresses from Kolkata
Bengali actresses
Actresses in Bengali cinema
Bengali television actresses
Indian television actresses
Indian film actresses
Politicians from Kolkata
West Bengal politicians
Trinamool Congress politicians from West Bengal
Women in West Bengal politics
Indian actor-politicians
21st-century Indian actresses
21st-century Indian women politicians